George Earl Mock (September 24, 1907 – November 25, 2001) was labor leader and official of the Teamsters. He was interim president of the Teamsters from May 7 to May 15, 1981, after the death of president Frank Fitzsimmons.

Mock was born in Los Angeles, California to Hanna Moe, a Scandinavian woman. Later in life he would be known as 'The Swede' because of his  stature  and fair appearance. His step-father worked as a teamster along the area's canals. As a boy Mock drove canal mule teams for his father and later worked briefly at the Vernon Kilns. In 1934, Mock joined Teamsters Local 208. He was elected the local's secretary-treasurer in 1940. During his tenure as a local leader, he helped organize workers at Dole Food Company, Del Monte Foods, and Sears, Roebuck and Company—expanding the membership from 240 to 8,000 members by 1945.

Mock was appointed the first director of the Teamsters' Western Warehouse and Produce Council in 1945. In 1948, he was appointed the first director of the Teamsters' National Warehouse Conference.

In 1957, Mock was elected a vice president of the international union. He rose through the vice presidential ranks until elected First Vice President in 1979.

In 1967 and 70 Mock negotiated, with Lou Goldblatt, the first joint contract with the ILWU.

When Teamsters president Frank Fitzsimmons died on May 7, 1981, Mock assumed the presidency. But his advanced age militated against his election as president at the upcoming membership convention.  He voluntarily stepped down as interim president on May 15, just eight days later, in favor of interim president Roy Lee Williams.

He retired from the union in 1984.

Mock and his wife, Rose Catherine (née. Aiello) who preceded him in death, had one son. Mock died in Carmichael, California of natural causes (old age).

References

"Mock, George Earl." San Francisco Chronicle. November 27, 2001.
Serrin, William. "Interim President Takes Over A Troubled Teamsters' Union." New York Times. May 16, 1981.
Shabecoff, Philip. "Frank Fitzsimmons of Teamsters Dies." New York Times. May 7, 1981.
"Teamsters Mourn George Mock." Press release. International Brotherhood of Teamsters. November 29, 2001.
"ILWU History Series, "A Liberal Journalist On the Air and On the Waterfront: Labor and Political Issues, 1932-1990, Sidney Roger."

1907 births
2001 deaths
People from Los Angeles
Presidents of the International Brotherhood of Teamsters
American trade unionists of Swedish descent
Trade unionists from California